The Wilson Residential Historic District encompasses a cluster of four upscale residences just northeast of downtown Wilson, Arkansas, a city in Mississippi County, Arkansas. Founded in 1886 as a company town by Robert Edward Lee Wilson, the city's growth was regulated and planned by the company until it was formally incorporated in 1950. This district encompasses four houses built by owners and managers of the company, and related family members. Notable among them is the 1925 Tudor Revival house of Robert E. Lee Wilson Jr.

The district was listed on the National Register of Historic Places in 2016. It includes the Tudor-style home of Robert E. Lee Wilson, who went by the name Lee, designed by Memphis-based architect [George Mahan Jr.]

See also
National Register of Historic Places listings in Mississippi County, Arkansas

References

Historic districts on the National Register of Historic Places in Arkansas
National Register of Historic Places in Mississippi County, Arkansas
Houses in Mississippi County, Arkansas
Houses on the National Register of Historic Places in Arkansas
Tudor Revival architecture in Arkansas
Company housing
Wilson, Arkansas